The Videosingles is a home video music compilation by the British group Tears For Fears. Released in 1983, it features the three UK Top 5 hit singles from the band's no.1 debut album The Hurting.

Track listing
Mad World (directed by Clive Richardson)
Change (directed by Clive Richardson)
Pale Shelter (directed by Steve Barron)
(additional music: Start Of The Breakdown)

All music produced by Chris Hughes and Ross Cullum.

Tears for Fears video albums
1983 video albums
Music video compilation albums
1983 compilation albums